Suszka may refer to the following places in Poland:
Suszka, Lower Silesian Voivodeship (south-west Poland)
Suszka, Lublin Voivodeship (east Poland)
Suszka, Pomeranian Voivodeship (north Poland)
Suszka, West Pomeranian Voivodeship (north-west Poland)